WSWY-LD is a low-power television station licensed to Indianapolis, Indiana. It was originally licensed to serve Terre Haute, Indiana, until it relocated to Indianapolis in 2020. It was most recently a repeater that broadcasts programming from the Trinity Broadcasting Network, via satellite.

History
The station was founded on May 22, 1987, by the Trinity Broadcasting Network, and did not sign on until August 22, 1990, as a Trinity Broadcasting Network owned & operated station, under the callsign W65BK and would broadcast on channel 65 until 2001. The station's callsign would change to W43BV on July 24, 2001, and would move the station to channel 43 for a better reception and to gain viewership.

The station would broadcast an all religious format from its sign on, until TBN took W43BV silent on March 26, 2010, due to declining support, which has been attributed to the digital transition. TBN would later sell the station to the Minority Media and Television Council, which in turn would sell the station to Digital Networks - Midwest.

On March 26, 2006, the station was granted a construction permit to begin converting operations to digital television on channel 43, via a digital flash cut. However, as a result of the FCC Spectrum auction (which took place from 2018 to 2020), the station would apply to move their digital signal to Channel 20. Upon completion, the station will broadcast at 15 kW.

On October 16, 2015, the station would change its callsign from W43BV to WSWY-LP.

On March 26, 2020, Reach High Media Group & Digital Networks - Midwest would file a construction and relocation permit, and would agree to locate the station from Terre Haute, Indiana to Indianapolis, Indiana. The relocation of WSWY-LP was finalized on July 16, 2020. The station was licensed for digital operation at the same time, and changed its call sign to WSWY-LD.

References

External links

SWY-LD
Television channels and stations established in 1989
1989 establishments in Indiana